Roy Campbell Smith (1858 – April 11, 1940) was an American naval officer and the Governor of Guam from 1916 to 1918.

Early life 
On July 16, 1858, Smith was born in Fort Mason, Texas. Smith's father was Charles Henry Smith, an assistant surgeon general of the United States and later of the Confederate States of America. Smith's mother was Maria McGregor Campbell Smith.

Education 
In 1878, Smith graduated from the United States Naval Academy in Annapolis, Maryland.

Career 

In 1916, Smith became the Naval Governor of Guam, until 1918.

Smith retired as a U.S. Navy Captain.

Awards 
  Navy Cross

Personal life 
On October 11, 1887, in Annapolis, Maryland, Smith married Margaret Aldrich Sampson, daughter of Rear admiral William Thomas Sampson. They had three children, Roy, Marjorie, and William.

Smith's daughter Marjorie Sampson Smith became a sponsor of USS Sampson (DD-63) on March 4, 1916. It was named for Rear admiral William Thomas Sampson, Smith's father-in-law. In 1918, Smith's daughter Marjorie Sampson Smith married Spotswood Dandridge Bowers, a lawyer.

On May 21, 1929, Smith's wife Margaret Smith died in Newport, Rhode Island. She is interred at Lakewood Cemetery in Cooperstown, New York.

On April 11, 1940, Smith died in Somerville, South Carolina.

References

External links 
 Roy Campbell Smith at findagrave.com
 Roy Campbell Smith st militarytimes.com
 Capt. Roy Campbell Smith, USN at geni.com

1858 births
1940 deaths
Governors of Guam
20th-century American naval officers